The Regional State Administrative Agency for Southwestern Finland is one of the six Regional State Administrative Agencies. The administrative area of the agency consists of two regions, 9 districts and 77 municipalities.

Regions

References 

Western Finland Province